Spicomellus (meaning "collar of spikes") is an extinct genus of herbivorous ankylosaurian dinosaur that lived in the supercontinent Gondwana during the Middle Jurassic Period. The type and only known species is Spicomellus afer, named and described in 2021. Its remains were found in the third subunit of the El Mers Group (Bathonian-Callovian), near Boulahfa, south of Boulemane, Fès-Meknès, Morocco. The genus name means "spiked collar", from the Latin 'spica' meaning spike, and 'mellum' meaning spiked dog collar and the specific name 'afer' means "the African".

During the Jurassic, eurypodan dinosaurs, in particular stegosaurs, were diverse and abundant in Laurasia (nowadays the northern continents), but their remains are extremely rare in Gondwanan deposits, nowadays the southern continents. Nevertheless, the existence of fragmentary remains and trackways in the deposits of Gondwana indicates the presence of eurypodan taxa there. Spicomellus is the second described eurypodan taxon from North Africa, after Adratiklit, and the oldest known ankylosaur from anywhere in the world, with the possible exception of an unnamed thyreophoran from the Isle of Skye, Scotland that could be up to 2 million years older than Spicomellus, though it is still unknown if this older species was a stegosaur or an ankylosaur. The holotype, NHMUK PV R37412, is housed at the Natural History Museum in London.

Discovery and naming
It is unknown when the holotype specimen, NHMUK PV R37412, was discovered, but what is known is that it was acquired by the Natural History Museum from a commercial fossil dealer, Moussa Direct, based in Cambridge, U.K. in 2019. Maidment initially believed that the fossil was a forgery, but after CT scanning the fossil, she drew the conclusion that it was a genuine fossil, and Spicomellus afer was described by Maidment et al., on the 23rd of September, 2021 in an article published online in paleontological journal Nature Ecology & Evolution. The holotype of Spicomellus afer consists of a single rib with four co-ossified spines. This is a trait unique to Spicomellus and not known from any other vertebrate. The holotype specimen was histologically sectioned to confirm that it was an ankylosaurian. The information about the locality of the fossil was provided by Direct and confirmed through discussion with the Moroccan fossil dealer who sold it to him. The locality was visited by S.C.R.M. and D.O. in 2019 and 2020, respectively, to study the sedimentology and stratigraphy of the area. They found that the formation consisted of shallow marine and continental mixed clastic, evaporitic and carbonate sediments.

Description
Despite being a basal ankylosaurian, the preserved dermal spikes of the holotype were fused to the bone, which is a trait unique to Spicomellus and not known from any other vertebrate. Because the dermal spikes were fused to the bone instead of being attached to muscle tissue in all other ankylosaurs, this trait would probably have made it harder for the animal to move.

Though its exact size is unknown, it was likely comparable in size to other Middle Jurassic ankylosaurs like Sarcolestes and Tianchiasaurus. This puts our best size estimates for Spicomellus at no longer than  when fully grown.

Classification 
At first, Susannah Maidment was unsure whether Spicomellus was a stegosaur or an ankylosaur, but Maidment et al. (2021) confirmed that Spicomellus is a basal ankylosaurian. It was probably closely related to the only other known ankylosaurs that were alive at the same time, Sarcolestes and Tianchisaurus. These species come from the U.K. and China, respectively.

Paleoecology
Spicomellus is only known from the El Mers Group's El Mers III Formation. It coexisted with the sauropod "Cetiosaurus" mogrebiensis (which may or may not be synonymous with the sauropod Atlasaurus from the contemporaneous terrestrial Guettioua Formation) and the stegosaur Adratiklit, browsing on low-growing plants and roots and tubers. Predators of the ecosystem consist of indeterminate theropods (possible megalosaurids).

The discovery of Spicomellus also shows that the two major thyreophoran groups (Ankylosauria and Stegosauria) co-existed for over 20 million years, and implies that the extinction of the stegosaurs may have happened for other, still unknown reasons.

References

Ankylosaurs
Ornithischian genera
Bathonian genera
Middle Jurassic dinosaurs of Africa
Jurassic Morocco
Fossils of Morocco
Fossil taxa described in 2021